Big Tree Records was a record label founded by Doug Morris in 1970. It was best known for releases by Lobo, England Dan & John Ford Coley, Brownsville Station, Johnny Rivers, Dave and Ansel Collins, Canadian band April Wine, and British R&B group Hot Chocolate.

The label was initially distributed by Ampex Records from 1970 to 1971, and then by Bell Records from 1972 to 1973.  Morris sold the label to Atlantic Records in 1974, and became co-chairman of Atlantic. The label continued to operate as a subsidiary of Atlantic, until Atlantic shut the label down in 1980.

See also
 List of record labels

References

External links
 Big Tree Records story from BSN Pubs

American record labels
Record labels established in 1970
Record labels disestablished in 1980
Pop record labels